Andrew Croft may refer to:

 Andrew Croft, explorer
 Andy Croft, writer
Andrew A. Croft, US Air Force general

See also
Andrew Crofts (disambiguation)